The title Hero of the Soviet Union was the highest distinction of the Soviet Union. It was awarded 12,775 times. Due to the large size of the list, it has been broken up into multiple pages.

 Semyon Zabagonsky ru
 Vyacheslav Zabaluev ru
 Ivan Zabegaylo ru
 Grigory Zabelin ru
 Nikolai Zebelkin ru
 Ivan Zabobonov ru
 Ivan Zabolotny ru
 Anatoly Zabolotsky ru
 Konstantin Zaborovsky ru
 Stepan Zaborev ru
 Aleksandr Zaboyarkin ru
 Nikolai Zabrodin ru
 Anatoly Zabronsky ru
 Nikolai Zabyrin ru
 Mikhail Zavadovsky ru
 Vladimir Zavadsky ru
 Viktor Zavalin ru
 Andrey Zavarzin ru
 Grigory Zavarin ru
 Ivan Zavarykin ru
 Vasily Zavgorodny ru
 Grigory Zavgorodny ru
 Yegor Zavelitsky ru
 Yakov Zavertalyuk ru
 Veniamin Zavertyaev ru
 Nikolai Zaveryukha ru
 Matevy Zavodsky ru
 Boris Zavoryzgin ru
 Ivan Zavrazhnov ru
 Nikolai Zavrazhnov ru
 Nikolai Zavyalov ru
 Semyon Zavyalov ru
 Sergey Zavyalov ru
 Vasily Zagaynov ru
 Georgy Zagaynov ru
 Stepan Zagaynov ru
 Aleksandr Zagarinsky ru
 Fakhrutdin Zagidulin ru
 Vladimir Zagnoy ru
 Anatoly Zagovenev ru
 Vasily Zagorodnev ru
 Mikhail Zagorodsky ru
 Dmitry Zagorulko ru
 Stepan Zagrebin ru
 Ivan Zagryadsky ru
 Vasily Zadkov ru
 Nikolai Zadorin ru
 Vladimir Zadorozhny ru
 Grigory Zadorozhny ru
 Ivan Zadorozhny ru
 Mikhail Alekseyevich Zadorozhny ru
 Mikhail Ignatevich Zadorozhny ru
 Yakov Zadorozhny ru
 Viktor Zaevsky ru
 Ivan Zazhigin ru
 Grigory Zaika ru
 Vasily Zaikin ru
 Ivan Zaikin ru
 Mitrofan Zaikin ru
 Sergey Zaikin ru
 Fyodor Zaikin ru
 Vladimir Zaimov
 Nikolai Zaiyulev ru
 Ivan Zaikin ru
 Nikolai Zaikovsky ru
 Aleksandr Zaitsev ru
 Aleksey Zaitsev ru
 Boris Zaitsev ru
 Valentin Zaitsev ru
 Vasily Aleksandrovich Zaitsev (twice)
 Vasily Vasilyevich Zaitsev ru
 Vasily Vladimirovich Zaitsev ru
 Vasily Georgievich Zaitsev ru
 Vasily Grigorievich Zaitsev
 Vasily Ivanovich Zaitsev (lieutenant) ru
 Vasily Ivanovich Zaitsev (lieutenant colonel) ru
 Vasily Mikhailovich Zaitsev ru
 Vasily Petrovich Zaitsev ru
 Veniamin Zaitsev ru
 Gennady Zaitsev ru
 Dmitry Aleksandrovich Zaitsev ru
 Dmitry Mikhailovich Zaitsev ru
 Ivan Dmitrievich Zaitsev ru
 Ivan Nikolaevich Zaitsev ru
 Ivan Petrovich Zaitsev ru
 Ivan Stepanovich Zaitsev ru
 Ivan Fyodorovich Zaitsev ru
 Konstantin Zaitsev ru
 Mikhail Zaitsev
 Nikolai Ivanovich Zaitsev ru
 Nikolai Ilyich Zaitsev ru
 Nikolai Sergeyevich Zaitsev ru
 Nikolai Yakovlevich Zaitsev ru
 Pavel Zaitsev ru
 Stepan Zaitsev ru
 Yakov Zaitsev ru
 Akhmet Zakirov ru
 Gali Zakirov ru
 Kirill Zaklepa ru
 Ivan Zaklyuka ru
 Nikolai Zakorkin ru
 Vladimir Zakudryaev ru
 Stepan Zakurdaev ru
 Nikolai Zakutenko ru
 Vladimir Zalevsky ru
 Prokhor Zalesov ru
 Khasan Zamanov ru
 Pavel Zamiralov ru
 Mikhail Gavrilovich Zamula ru
 Mikhail Kuzmich Zamula ru
 Mikhail Zamulaev ru
 Pyotr Zamchalov ru
 Ivan Zamyatin ru
 Ivan Zanin ru
 Aleksandr Zapadinsky ru
 Igor Zaporozhan ru
 Sergey Zaporozhets ru
 Fyodor Zaporozhets ru
 Ivan Zaporozhsky ru
 Grigory Zaporozhchenko ru
 Dmitry Zaporozhchenko ru
 Vladimir Zarembo ru
 Pavel Zaretsky ru
 Mikhail Zaretskikh ru
 Ivan Zarnikov ru
 Anatoly Zarovnyaev ru
 Vladimir Zarubin ru
 Ivan Zarubin ru
 Yuri Zarudin ru
 Stepan Zarudnev ru
 Nikolai Zaryanov ru
 Vyacheslav Zasedatelev ru
 Konstantin Zaslonov
 Ivan Zasorin ru
 Vladimir Zasyadko ru
 Vyacheslav Zatylkov ru
 Ivan Zatynaychenko ru
 Ivan Zaulin ru
 Aleksey Arkhipovich Zakharov ru
 Aleksey Ivanovich Zakharov (lieutenant) ru
 Aleksey Ivanovich Zakharov (sergeant) ru
 Aleksey Nikonorovich Zakharov ru
 Vasily Grigorievich Zakharov ru
 Vasily Ivanovich Zakharov ru
 Vasily Yakovlevich Zakharov ru
 Viktor Zakharov ru
 Gennady Zakharov ru
 Georgy Zakharov
 Ivan Yegorovich Zakharov ru
 Ivan Konstantinovich Zakharov ru
 Ivan Kuzmich Zakharov ru
 Konstantin Zakharov ru
 Lev Zakharov ru
 Matvey Zakharov
 Mitrofan Zakharov ru
 Nikolai Dmitrievich Zakharov ru
 Nikolai Nikolaevich Zakharov ru
 Nikolai Sergeyevich Zakharov ru
 Pyotr Zakharov ru
 Sergey Zakharov ru
 Fyodor Zakharov ru
 Vasily Zakharchenko ru
 Grigory Zakharchenko ru
 Mikhail Zakharchenko ru
 Pavel Zakharchenko ru
 Aleksandr Zakharchuk ru
 Nikolai Zakharchuk ru
 Vaginak Zakharyan ru
 Nikanor Zakhvataev
 Aleksandr Zakhodsky ru
 Lev Zatsepa ru
 Fyodor Zatsepilov ru
 Aleksey Zatsepilov ru
 Vasily Zacheslavsky ru
 Pytor Zachinyaev ru
 Mikhail Zashibalov ru
 Vasily Zayakin ru
 Denis Zayats ru
 Grigory Zbanatsky ru
 Panteley Zvarygin ru
 Ivan Zvezdin ru
 Anatoly Zverev ru
 Valentin Pavlovich Zverev ru
 Vasily Andreyevich Zverev ru
 Vasily Vasilyevich Zverev ru
 Vasily Vladimirovich Zverev ru
 Georgy Zverev ru
 Ivan Zverev ru
 Nikolai Aleksandrovich Zverev ru
 Nikolai Kuzmich Zverev ru
 Nikolai Zverintsev ru
 Pyotr Zverkov ru
 Stepan Zvonaryov ru
 Trofim Zvonkov ru
 Aleksandr Zvyagin ru
 Andrey Zvyagin ru
 Pyotr Zgama ru
 Dmitry Zhabinsky ru
 Nikolai Zhaboedov ru
 Vasily Zhavoronkov ru
 Viktor Zhagala ru
 Ivan Zhagrenkov ru
 Maksim Zhadeykin ru
 Aleksey Zhadov
 Kuzhabai Zhazykov ru
 Vladimir Zhayvoron ru
 Sadyk Zhaksygulov ru
 Fyodor Zhaldak ru
 Semyon Zhalo ru
 Darma Zhanaev ru
 Zbdulla Zhanzakov ru
 Anatoly Zharikov ru
 Ivan Zharikov ru
 Vladimir Zharkov ru
 Sergey Zharov ru
 Fyodor Zharov ru
 Fyodor Zharchinsky ru
 Mikhail Zhbanov ru
 Filipp Zhgirov ru
 Aleksey Zhdanov ru
 Vladimir Zhdanov
 Yefim Zhdanov ru
 Pavel Zhdanov ru
 Leonid Zhdanovsky ru
 Aleksandr Zhevarchenkov ru
 Leonid Zhegalov ru
 Aleksandr Zhezherya ru
 Ivan Zhelvakov ru
 Nikolai Zhelezny ru
 Spartak Zhelezny ru
 Pyotr Zheleznyakov ru
 Fyodor Zhelnov ru
 Pavel Zheltikov ru
 Iosif Zheltobryukh ru
 Akim Zheltov ru
 Aleksey Zheltov ru
 Ivan Zheltoplyasov ru
 Pyotr Zheltukhin ru
 Ivan Zhemchuzhnikov ru
 Vladimir Zhenchenko ru
 Nikolai Zherdev ru
 Yevgeny Zherdy ru
 Dmitry Zherebilov ru
 Dmitry Zherebin ru
 Vasily Grigorievich Zherebtsov ru
 Vasily Semyonovich Zherebtsov ru
 Ivan Ivanovich Zherebtsov ru
 Ivan Kuzmich Zherebtsov ru
 Aleksandr Ivanovich Zhestkov ru
 Aleksandr Petrovich Zhestkov ru
 Todor Zhivkov
 Anatoly Zhivov ru
 Mikhail Zhivolup ru
 Iosif Zhigarev ru
 Fyodor Zhigarin ru
 Yevgeniya Zhigulenko
 Boris Zhigulenkov ru
 Kirill Zhigulsky ru
 Vladimir Zhigunov ru
 Aleksandr Zhidkikh ru
 Ivan Andreyevich Zhidkov ru
 Ivan Sergeyevich Zhidkov ru
 Pyotr Zhidkov ru
 Georgy Zhidov ru
 Aleksey Zhizhkun ru
 Fyodor Zhila ru
 Aleksandr Zhilin ru
 Vasily Zhilin
 Yegor Zhilin ru
 Dmitry Zhilkin ru
 Vasily Zhiltsov ru
 Lev Zhiltsov
 Konstantin Zhilyaev ru
 Vasily Zhikharev ru
 Nikolai Zhikharev ru
 Nikolai Zhmaev ru
 Vasily Zhmakin ru
 Filipp Zhmachenko
 Ivan Zhmurko ru
 Dmitry Zhmurovsky ru
 Seliverst Zhogin ru
 Semyon Zhogov ru
 Stepan Zholob ru
 Vitaly Zholobov
 Viktor Zholudev
 Leonid Zholudev ru
 Naum Zholudev ru
 Semyon Zhorov ru
 Pavel Zhuvasin ru
 Nikolai Zhugan
 Ivan Zhudov ru
 Nikolai Zhuzhoma ru
 Ivan Zhuzhukin ru
 Aleksandr Zhuk ru
 Nikolai Zhukanov ru
 Aleksandr Zhukov ru
 Andrey Zhukov ru
 Valentin Zhukov ru
 Vasily Alekseyevich Zhukov ru
 Vasily Yegorovich Zhukov ru
 Vasily Petrovich Zhukov ru
 Vasily Frolovich Zhukov ru
 Vladimir Zhukov ru
 Georgy Ivanovich Zhukov ru
 Marshall Georgy Zhukov (four times)
 Grigory Zhukov ru
 Danil Zhukov ru
 Ivan Yefimovich Zhukov
 Ivan Mikhailovich Zhukov ru
 Ivan Fyodorovich Zhukov ru
 Konstantin Zhukov ru
 Mikhail Zhukov ru
 Nikolai Zhukov ru
 Pyotr Konstantinovich Zhukov ru
 Pyotr Sergeyevich Zhukov ru
 Roman Zhukov ru
 Stepan Zhukov ru
 Fyodor Zhukov ru
 Nikolai Zhukovsky ru
 Pyotr Zhukovsky ru
 Fyodor Zhulov ru
 Pyotr Zhulyabin ru
 Sergey Zhunin ru
 Mikhail Zhuravkov ru
 Aleksandr Zhuravlyov ru
 Aleksey Zhuravlyov ru
 Andriyan Zhuravlyov ru
 Vasily Zhuravlyov ru
 Ivan Zhuravlyov ru
 Lavrenty Zhuravlyov ru
 Pyotr Zhuravlyov ru
 Stpean Zhuravlyov ru
 Ivan Makarovich Zhurba ru
 Ivan Timofeyevich Zhurba ru
 Pavel Zhurba ru
 Ivan Zhurilo ru
 Grigory Zhuchenko ru
 Pavel Zhuchenko ru
 Porfiry Zhuchkov ru
 Tikhon Zhuchkov ru
 Stepan Zdorovtsev ru
 Vasily Zdunov ru
 Nikolai Zebnitsky ru
 Valentin Zevakhin ru
 Mikhail Zevakhin ru
 Aleksandr Zeyberlin ru
 Vladimir Zelenyov ru
 Andrey Zelenin ru
 Yegor Zelyonkin ru
 Mikhail Zelyonkin ru
 Yekaterina Zelenko
 Nikolai Zelenov
 Gavriil Zelensky ru
 Fyodor Zelensky ru
 Valentin Zelentsov ru
 Viktor Zelentsov ru
 Iosif Zelenyuk ru
 Ivan Zelepukin ru
 Yevgeny Zelnyakov ru
 Aleksandr Zemkov ru
 Vasily Zemlyakov ru
 Andrey Zemlyanov ru
 Serafim Zemlyanov ru
 Vladimir Zemlyansky ru
 Filimon Zemlyanykh ru
 Ivan Zemnukhov ru
 Vladimir Zemzkikh ru
 Mikhail Zemskov ru
 Nikolai Zemtsov ru
 Pyotr Zemtsov ru
 Illarion Zenin ru
 Nikolai Zenkov ru
 Arkady Zenkovsky ru
 Vladimir Zentsov ru
 Yefrosinya Zenkova
 Sergey Zernin ru
 Mukhamed Ziangirov ru
 Vasily Ziborov ru
 Ivan Zibrov ru
 Ilya Zigunenko ru
 Viktor Zikeyev ru
 Yevgeny Zikran ru
 Ivan Zima ru
 Ivan Zimakov ru
 Viktor Zimin ru
 Georgy Zimin ru
 Yevgeny Zimin ru
 Sergey Zimin ru
 Yakov Zimin ru
 Vasily Zimnyagin ru
 Abram Zibdels ru
 Ivan Zinenko ru
 Andrey Zinin ru
 Nabiulla Zinnurov ru
 Nikolai Zinov ru
 Vasily Zinovev ru
 Ivan Alekseyevich Zinovev ru
 Ivan Dmitrievich Zinovev ru
 Ivan Ivanovich Zinovev ru
 Nikolai Anisimovich Zinovev ru
 Nikolai Ivanovich Zinovev ru
 Fyodor Zinovev ru
 Mikhail Zinukov ru
 Aleksandr Zinchenko ru
 Aleksey Zinchenko ru
 Valentin Zinchenko ru
 Ivan Mikhailovich Zinchenko ru
 Ivan Trofimovich Zinchenko ru
 Nikifor Zinchenko ru
 Nikolai Zinchenko ru
 Sergey Zinchenko ru
 Fyodor Zinchenko ru
 Mitrofan Zinkovich ru
 Yefim Zlatin ru
 Yakov Zlobin ru
 Grigory Zlotin ru
 Ivan Zlygostev ru
 Ivan Zlydenny ru
 Vasily Zlydnev ru
 Mikhail Zmyslya ru
 Valerian Znamensky ru
 Vladimir Znamensky ru
 Andrey Zozulya ru
 Georgy Zozulya ru
 Maksim Zozulya ru
 Ivan Zolin ru
 Andrey Zolkin ru
 Aleksey Zolotaryov ru
 Ivan Zolotaryov ru
 Semyon Zolotaryov ru
 Fyodor Zolototrubov ru
 Boris Zolotukhin ru
 Mikhail Zolotukhin ru
 Mikhail Zonov ru
 Nikolai Zonov ru
 Panteley Zonov ru
 Rikhard Zorge ru
 Aleksey Zorin ru
 Grigory Zorin ru
 Ivan Zorin ru
 Sergey Ivanovich Zorin ru
 Sergey Petrovich Zorin ru
 Vasily Zorkin ru
 Viktor Zotov ru
 Ivan Zotov ru
 Matvey Zotov ru
 Ivan Zrelov ru
 Nikolai Zub ru
 Feofilakt Zubanov ru
 Nikolai Zubanev ru
 Aleksandr Gordeyevich Zubarev ru
 Aleksandr Fyodorovich Zubarev ru
 Vasily Zubarev ru
 Ivan Zubarev ru
 Mikhail Zubarev ru
 Ivan Zubenko ru
 Pavel Zubenko ru
 Pyotr Zubko ru
 Aleksandr Zubkov ru
 Ivan Zubkov ru
 Antonina Zubkova
 Grigory Zubov ru
 Leonid Zubov ru
 Pyotr Zubov ru
 Konstantin Zubovich ru
 Vasily Zudilov ru
 Ivan Zudilov ru
 Sergey Zudlov ru
 Vyacheslav Zudov
 Aleksey Alekseyevich Zuev ru
 Aleksey Mikhailovich Zuev ru
 Gavriil Zuev ru
 Ivan Dmitrievich Zuev ru
 Ivan Fadeyevich Zuev ru
 Kuzma Zuev ru
 Mikhail Zuev ru
 Nikolai Zuev ru
 Ivan Zuenko ru
 Aleksey Zuykov ru
 Boris Zumbulidze ru
 Ivan Zybin ru
 Filipp Zykin ru
 Nikolai Zykov ru
 Yuri Zykov ru
 Vasily Zyl ru
 Pavel Zyubin ru
 Vasily Zyuzin ru
 Dmitry Zyuzin ru
 Pyotr Zyuzin ru
 Sergey Zyuzin ru
 Ivan Zyuz ru
 Pyotr Zyulkov ru
 Vasily Zyulkovsky ru

References 
 

 

 Russian Ministry of Defence Database «Подвиг Народа в Великой Отечественной войне 1941—1945 гг.» [Feat of the People in the Great Patriotic War 1941-1945] (in Russian).

Lists of Heroes of the Soviet Union